Grupo Desportivo de Bragança (abbreviated as GD Bragança) is a Portuguese football club based in Bragança in the district of Bragança.

Background
GD Bragança currently plays in the Terceira Divisão Série A which is the fourth tier of Portuguese football. The club was founded in 1943 and they play their home matches at the Municipal de Bragança in Bragança.  The stadium can accommodate 5,000 spectators.

The club is affiliated to Associação de Futebol de Bragança and has competed in the Taça Federação Portuguesa Futebol 3ª Divisão.  The club has also entered the national cup competition known as Taça de Portugal (Cup of Portugal) on many occasions. They reached the quarter-finals of the 2006/07 Taça de Portugal before being knocked out by C.F. «Os Belenenses».

Season to season

League and cup history

Honours
Terceira Divisão: 1978/79, 1985/86, 1999/00, 2002/03
Taça Federação Portuguesa Futebol 3ª Divisão: 1976/77

Notable former managers
 António Amaral
 Eduardo Luís

Footnotes

External links
Official website 

Football clubs in Portugal
Association football clubs established in 1943
1943 establishments in Portugal
Bragança, Portugal